Arif Magomedov (born 4 August 1992) is a Russian professional boxer.

Professional boxing record

|style="text-align:center;" colspan="9"|21 fights, 18 wins (11 knockouts), 3 losses (1 knockout)
|-style="text-align:center;background:#e3e3e3;"
|style="border-style:none none solid solid;"|
|style="border-style:none none solid solid;"|Result
|style="border-style:none none solid solid;"|Record
|style="border-style:none none solid solid;"|Opponent
|style="border-style:none none solid solid;"|Type
|style="border-style:none none solid solid;"|Round, time
|style="border-style:none none solid solid;"|Date
|style="border-style:none none solid solid;"|Location
|style="border-style:none none solid solid;"|Notes
|-align=center
|21
|Loss
|18–3
|align=left| Lasha Gurguliani
|UD
|8
|27 May 2018
|align=left|
|align=left|
|- align=center
|20
|Loss
|18–2
|align=left| Luis Arias
|TKO
|5 (10), 1:16
|17 Jun 2017
|align=left|
|align=left|
|- align=center
|19
|Win
|18–1
|align=left| Chris Herrmann
|TKO
|2 (10), 1:50
|21 Nov 2016
|align=left|
|align=left|
|- align=center
|18
|Loss
|17–1
|align=left| Andrew Hernandez
|UD
|10
|21 May 2016
|align=left|
|align=left|
|- align=center
|17
|Win
|17–0
|align=left| Jonathan Tavira
|KO
|7 (10) 0:55
|12 Dec 2015
|align=left|
|align=left|
|- align=center
|16
|Win
|16–0
|align=left| Derrick Webster
|UD
|10
|17 Jul 2015
|align=left|
|align=left|
|- align=center
|15
|Win
|15–0
|align=left| Darnell Boone
|TKO
|1 (8), 2:37
|22 May 2015
|align=left|
|align=left|
|- align=center
|14
|Win
|14–0
|align=left| Derrick Findley
|UD
|8
|02 Apr 2015
|align=left|
|align=left|
|- align=center
|13
|Win
|13–0
|align=left| Michael Zerafa
|UD
|10
|24 Oct 2014
|align=left|
|align=left|
|- align=center
|12
|Win
|12–0
|align=left| Patrick Mendy
|UD
|12
|09 Aug 2014
|align=left|
|align=left|
|- align=center
|11
|Win
|11–0
|align=left| Alex Theran
|RTD
|3 (10), 3:00
|24 Apr 2014
|align=left|
|align=left|
|- align=center
|10
|Win
|10–0
|align=left| Slavisa Simeunovic
|TKO
|1 (10), 1:34
|23 Mar 2014
|align=left|
|align=left|
|- align=center
|9
|Win
|9–0
|align=left| Volodymyr Borovskyy
|UD
|10
|21 Mar 2014
|align=left|
|align=left|
|- align=center
|8
|Win
|8–0
|align=left| Thomas Mashali
|KO
|2 (12), 1:07
|16 Nov 2013
|align=left|
|align=left|
|- align=center
|7
|Win
|7–0
|align=left| Marat Khuzeev
|KO
|1 (10), 1:23
|19 Oct 2013
|align=left|
|align=left|
|- align=center
|6
|Win
|6–0
|align=left| Karen Avetisyan
|UD
|8
|24 Aug 2013
|align=left|
|align=left|
|- align=center
|5
|Win
|5–0
|align=left| Segundo Herrera
|KO
|3 (6), 1:44
|17 May 2013
|align=left|
|align=left|
|- align=center
|4
|Win
|4–0
|align=left| Andrey Korzhenevsky
|KO
|2 (8), 0:29
|20 Apr 2013
|align=left|
|align=left|
|- align=center
|3
|Win
|3–0
|align=left| Andrey Polyakov
|TKO
|2 (6), 2:28
|08 Mar 2013
|align=left|
|align=left|
|- align=center
|2
|Win
|2–0
|align=left| Sergey Sergeev
|RTD
|3 (6), 3:00
|24 Feb 2013
|align=left|
|align=left|
|- align=center
|1
|Win
|1–0
|align=left| Ruslan Sirazhev
|SD
|4
|24 Jan 2013
|align=left|
|align=left|
|- align=center

References

External links
 

Living people
1992 births
Russian male boxers
Middleweight boxers
People from Kizlyar
Sportspeople from Dagestan
20th-century Russian people
21st-century Russian people